The Alien Registration Act, popularly known as the Smith Act, 76th United States Congress, 3d session, ch. 439,  is a United States federal statute that was enacted on June 28, 1940. It set criminal penalties for advocating the overthrow of the U.S. government by force or violence, and required all non-citizen adult residents to register with the federal government.

Approximately 215 people were indicted under the legislation, including alleged communists and socialists. Prosecutions under the Smith Act continued until a series of U.S. Supreme Court decisions in 1957 reversed a number of convictions under the Act as being unconstitutional. The law has been amended several times.

Legislative history
The U.S. government has attempted on several occasions to regulate speech in wartime, beginning with the Alien and Sedition Acts of 1798. During and following World War I, a series of statutes addressed a complex of concerns that included enemy espionage and disruption, anti-war activism, and the radical ideologies of anarchism and Bolshevism, all identified with immigrant communities. Congressional investigations of 'extremist' organizations in 1935 resulted in calls for the renewal of those statutes. The Foreign Agents Registration Act of 1938 addressed a particular concern but not the general problem. As U.S. involvement in World War II seemed ever more likely, the possibility of betrayal from within gained currency. The Spanish Civil War had given this possibility a name, a "fifth column", and the popular press in the U.S. blamed internal subversion for the fall of France to the Nazis in just six weeks in May and June 1940. Patriotic organizations and the popular press raised alarms and provided examples. In July 1940, Time magazine called fifth-column talk a "national phenomenon".

In the late 1930s, several legislative proposals tried to address sedition itself and the underlying concern with the presence of large numbers of non-citizens, including citizens of countries with which the U.S. might soon be at war. An omnibus bill that included several measures died in 1939, but the Senate Judiciary Committee revived it in May 1940. It drew some of its language from statutes recently passed at the state level, and combined anti-alien and anti-sedition sections with language crafted specifically to help the government in its attempts to deport Australian-born union leader Harry Bridges. With little debate, the House of Representatives approved it by a vote of 382 to 4, with 45 not voting, on June 22, 1940, the day the French signed an armistice with Germany. The Senate did not take a recorded vote. It was signed into law by President Franklin D. Roosevelt on June 28, 1940. The Act is referred to by the name of its principal author, Rep. Howard W. Smith (Democrat-Virginia), a leader of the anti-labor bloc in Congress.

A few weeks later, The New York Times discussed the context in which the alien registration provisions were included and the Act passed:

Also in June, the President transferred the Immigration and Naturalization Service from the Department of Labor to the Department of Justice (DOJ), demonstrating that the federal government viewed its alien population as a security concern as war grew more likely.

In mid-August, officials of the DOJ held a two-day conference with state officials they called "Law Enforcement Problems of National Defense". Attorney General Jackson and FBI Director Hoover delineated the proper roles for federal and state authorities with respect to seditious activities. They successfully forestalled state regulation of aliens and found state officials receptive to their arguments that states needed to prevent vigilantism and protect aliens, while trusting federal authorities to use the Smith Act to deal with espionage and "fifth column" activities.

On October 13, 1941, the 77th United States Congress amended the Smith Act, authorizing a criminal offense for the unlawful reproduction of alien registration receipt cards.

Provisions
Title I. Subversive activities. The Smith Act set federal criminal penalties that included fines or imprisonment for as long as twenty years, and denied all employment by the federal government for five years following a conviction for anyone who:

The Smith Act's prohibition of proselytizing on behalf of revolution repeated language found in previous statutes. It went beyond earlier legislation in outlawing action to "organize any society, group, or assembly" that works toward that end and then extended that prohibition to "membership" or "affiliation"—a term it did not define—with such a group.

Title II. Deportation. Because the Supreme Court in Kessler v. Strecker (1939) held that the Immigration Act of 1918 allowed the deportation of an alien only if his membership in a group advocating the violent overthrow of the government had not ceased, the Smith Act allowed for the deportation of any alien who "at the time of entering the United States, or ... at any time thereafter" was a member of or affiliated with such an organization.

The Smith Act expanded the grounds for deporting aliens to include weapons violations and abetting illegal immigration. It added heroin to the category of drug violations.

Title III. Alien registration. The Smith Act required aliens applying for visas to register and be fingerprinted. Every other alien resident of the United States:

Registration would be under oath and include:

Guardians had to register minors, who had to register in person and be fingerprinted within 30 days of their fourteenth birthday. Post offices were designated as the location for registering and fingerprinting. Aliens were to notify the government if their residence changed, and to confirm their residence every three months. Penalties included fines up to $1000 and up to six months imprisonment.

Alien registration
Registrations began on August 27, 1940, and the newly created Alien Registration Division of the Immigration and Naturalization Service planned to register between three and three-and-a-half million people at 45,000 post offices by December 26, after which those not registered became subject to the Smith Act's penalties. The Division held the view that registration benefited the alien, who "is now safeguarded from bigoted persecution." The alien was to bring a completed form to a post office and be fingerprinted. Registration cards would be delivered by mail and would serve "in the nature of protection of the alien later runs afoul of the police."  The details required for registration had been expanded since the passage of the Act to include race, employer's name and address, relatives in the U.S., organization memberships, application for citizenship, and military service record for the U.S. or any other country. Solicitor General Francis Biddle had responsibility for the Division, which was headed by Earl G. Harrison during its first six months. In a radio address meant to reassure aliens, Biddle said: "It was not the intention of Congress to start a witch hunt or a program of persecution." Calling it a "patriotic duty", he said:

Government efforts to encourage registration asked citizens to participate: 

The number registered passed 4.7 million by January 1941.

After the U.S. declared war in 1941, federal authorities used data gathered from alien registrations to identify citizens of enemy nations and take 2,971 of them into custody by the end of the year. A different set of requirements was imposed during the war on enemy aliens, citizens of nations with which the U.S. was at war by presidential proclamations of January 14, 1942, without reference to the Smith Act.

In December 1950, following an Immigration and Naturalization Service hearing, Claudia Jones, a citizen of Trinidad, was ordered deported from the U.S. for violating the McCarran Act as an alien (non-U.S. citizen) who had joined the Communist Party (CPUSA). The evidence of her party membership included information she provided when completing her Alien Registration form on December 24, 1940.

Legal proceedings

Harry Bridges
The Smith Act was written so that federal authorities could deport radical labor organizer Harry Bridges, an immigrant from Australia. Deportation hearings against Bridges in 1939 found he did not qualify for deportation because he was not currently—as the  required—a member of or affiliated with an organization that advocated the overthrow of the government. The Smith Act allowed deportation of an alien who had been "at any time" since arriving in the U.S. a member of, or affiliated with, such an organization. A second round of deportation hearings ended after ten weeks in June 1941.<ref>Steele, "Free Speech, 105, 107-9</ref> In September, the special examiner who led the hearings recommended deportation, but the Board of Immigration Appeals (BIA) reversed that order after finding the government's two key witnesses unreliable. In May 1942, though the Roosevelt administration was now putting its anti-Communist activities on hold in the interest of furthering the Soviet-American alliance, Attorney General Biddle overruled the BIA and ordered Bridges deported. Bridges appealed and lost in District Court and the Court of Appeals, but the Supreme Court held 5–3 on June 18, 1945, in the case of Bridges v. Wixon that the government had not proven Bridges was "affiliated" with the CPUSA, a word it interpreted to require more than "sympathy" or "mere cooperation".

Minneapolis 1941

On June 27, 1941, as part of a campaign to end labor militancy in the defense industry, FBI agents raided the Minneapolis and St. Paul offices of the Socialist Workers Party (SWP), a Trotskyist splinter party that controlled Local 544 of the Teamsters union though it had fewer than two thousand members in 30 U.S. cities. The union had grown steadily in the late 1930s, had organized federal relief workers and led a strike against the Works Progress Administration (WPA), a New Deal agency. In mid-July, a federal grand jury indicted 29 people, either members of the SWP or Local 544 of the Teamsters union, or both.

SWP defendants included James P. Cannon, Carl Skoglund, Farrell Dobbs, Grace Carlson, Harry DeBoer, Albert Goldman, and twelve other party leaders. Goldman acted as the defendants' lawyer during the trial. The SWP had been influential in Minneapolis since the Teamsters Strike of 1934. It advocated strikes and the continuation of labor union militancy during World War II under its Proletarian Military Policy. An SWP member edited the Northwest Organizer, the weekly newspaper of the Minneapolis Teamsters, and the local union remained militant even as the national union grew more conservative. The CPUSA supported the trial and conviction of Trotskyists under the Smith Act.  The defendants were accused of having plotted to overthrow the U.S. government in violation of the newly passed Smith Act and of the Sedition Act of 1861, to enforce which, according to Wallace MG as at March 1920, it seems no serious previous attempt had ever been made.

When critics argued that the government should adhere to the doctrine enunciated by Justice Holmes that free speech could only be prosecuted if it presented "a clear and present danger", Attorney General Biddle replied that Congress had considered both that standard and the international situation when writing the Smith Act's proscriptions. At trial, the judge took Biddle's view and refused to instruct the jury in the "clear and present danger" standard as the defendants' attorneys requested. The trial began in Federal District Court in Minneapolis on October 27, 1941. The prosecution presented evidence that the accused had amassed a small arsenal of pistols and rifles and conducted target practices and drills. Some had met with Trotsky in Mexico, and many witnesses testified to their revolutionary rhetoric.

The judge ordered that five of the defendants be acquitted on both counts for lack of evidence. After deliberating for 56 hours, the jury found the other 23 defendants (one had committed suicide during the trial) not guilty of violating the 1861 statute by conspiring to overthrow the government by force. The jury found 18 of the defendants guilty of violating the Smith Act either by distributing written material designed to cause insubordination in the armed forces or by advocating the overthrow of the government by force. The jury recommended leniency. On December 8, 1941, 12 defendants received 16-month sentences and the remaining 11 received 12-months. Time magazine minimized the danger from the SWP, calling it "a nestful of mice". The American Civil Liberties Union (ACLU) and critics on the left worried that the case created a dangerous precedent.

On appeal, a unanimous three-judge panel of the Eighth Circuit Court of Appeals upheld the convictions of the 18. The judges found it unnecessary to consider the "clear and present danger" standard in "situations where the legislative body had outlawed certain utterances". The Supreme Court declined to review the case. Those convicted began to serve their sentences on December 31, 1943. The last of them were released in February 1945. Biddle, in his memoirs published in 1962, regretted having authorized the prosecution.

Nazi sympathizers
Early in 1942, President Roosevelt, supported by the rest of his Cabinet, urged Attorney General Biddle to prosecute fascist sympathizers and anti-Semites. Biddle thought the Smith Act was inadequate, but Congress refused to renew the Sedition Act of 1918 as he asked.

In 1942, 16 members of the "Mankind United" semi-religious cult, including founder Arthur Bell, were arrested by the FBI under the act. Although 12 were found guilty, they all won on appeal and none served a jail sentence.

Historian Leo P. Ribuffo coined the term "Brown Scare" to cover the events leading up to the Washington 1944 sedition trial. President Roosevelt, who especially held non-interventionist Charles Lindbergh in disdain, had already asked J. Edgar Hoover of the FBI to investigate pro-Nazi individuals back in 1935. The pro-fascist right in the United States collapsed within a year of the attack on Pearl Harbor in the midst of the investigations.  

Crusader White Shirts
Life had published a photo of Christians in 1939 under the heading "Some of the Voices of Hate". Christians said he promoted a "human effort monetary system" and supported "a paper and ink revolution for economic liberty". After a four-day trial, he was convicted and sentenced to five years in prison on June 8.

Washington 1944
Thirty prominent individuals were indicted in Washington, D.C., in July 1942, accused of violations of the Smith Act, in what became the largest sedition trial in the US. After delays while the government amended the charges and struggled to construct its case, the trial, expanded to 33 defendants, began on April 17, 1944. The defendants were a heterogeneous group that held either isolationist or pro-fascist views. In the case of United States v. McWilliams named after Joe McWilliams, the prosecutor, O. John Rogge, hoped to prove they were Nazi propaganda agents by demonstrating the similarity between their statements and enemy propaganda. The weakness of the government's case, combined with the trial's slow progress in the face of disruption by the defendants, led the press to lose interest. A mistrial was declared on November 29, 1944, following the death of the trial judge, Edward C. Eicher. Among the defendants were: George Sylvester Viereck, Lawrence Dennis, Elizabeth Dilling, William Dudley Pelley, Joe McWilliams, Robert Edward Edmondson, James True, Gerald Winrod, William Griffin, Prescott Freese Dennett, and in absentia Ulrich Fleischhauer. Defendant Lawrence Dennis mocked the affair by subtitling his account of the trial The Great Sedition Trial of 1944.

Only Rogge wanted to retry the case to "stop the spread of racial and religious intolerance." Supreme Court decisions since the 1942 indictments made convictions appear ever more unlikely. Roger Baldwin of the ACLU campaigned against renewing the prosecutions, securing the endorsement of many of the defendants' ideological opponents, including the American Jewish Committee, while the CPUSA held out for prosecuting them all to the limit. Tom Clark, Biddle's replacement as Attorney General in the Truman administration, vacillated about the case. In October 1946, he fired Rogge in a public dispute about publicizing DOJ information about right-wing activities. With the end of World War II, attention turned from the defeated ideologies of the Axis powers to the threat of Communism, and in December 1946 the government had the charges dismissed.

Communist Party trials

After a ten-month trial at the Foley Square Courthouse in Manhattan, eleven leaders of the Communist Party were convicted under the Smith Act in 1949. Ten defendants received sentences of five years and $10,000 fines. An eleventh defendant, Robert G. Thompson, a distinguished hero of the Second World War, was sentenced to three years in consideration of his military record. The five defense attorneys were cited for contempt of court and given prison sentences. Those convicted appealed the verdicts, and the Supreme Court upheld their convictions in 1951 in Dennis v. United States in a 6–2 decision.

Following that decision, the DOJ prosecuted dozens of cases. In total, by May 1956, another 131 communists were indicted, of whom 98 were convicted, nine acquitted, while juries brought no verdict in the other cases. Other party leaders indicted included Claudia Jones and Elizabeth Gurley Flynn, a founding member of the ACLU who had been expelled in 1940 for being a Communist.

Appeals from other trials reached the Supreme Court with varying results. On June 17, 1957, Yates v. United States held unconstitutional the convictions of numerous party leaders in a ruling that distinguished between advocacy of an idea for incitement and the teaching of an idea as a concept. The same day, the Court ruled 6–1 in Watkins v. United States'' that defendants could use the First Amendment as a defense against "abuses of the legislative process". On June 5, 1961, the Supreme Court upheld by 5–4 the conviction of Junius Scales under the "membership clause" of the Smith Act. Scales began serving a six-year sentence on October 2, 1961. He was released after serving fifteen months when President John F. Kennedy commuted his sentence in 1962.

Trials of "second string" communist leaders also occurred in the 1950s, including that of Maurice Braverman.

See also
 Espionage Act of 1917
 Sedition Act of 1918
 Hatch Act of 1939
 Anti-Propaganda Act of 1940
 McCarthyism
 Subversive activities registration

Footnotes

External links
 Text of the Smith Act as passed, 1940
 Maintenance of National Security and the First Amendment, the Smith Act's legal history

1940 in American law
 
Anti-communism in the United States
Espionage in the United States
McCarthyism
Political repression in the United States
Smith Act
United States federal criminal legislation
United States federal defense and national security legislation
76th United States Congress
June 1940 events